During the George Floyd protests that started in Minneapolis–Saint Paul after the murder of George Floyd, there have been several incidents of vehicles being driven into people at the protests. According to Ari Weil, a terrorism researcher, there have been 104 incidents of vehicles driving into protests between May 27 and September 27, 2020, with two fatalities in that time period. According to law enforcement and terrorism experts some of the incidents were targeted and politically motivated, while others were incidents involving scared drivers who were surrounded by protesters in their vehicle. Ari Weil reported that at least 43 of the incidents were malicious and 39 people were charged.

List of incidents

See also
 Waukesha Christmas parade attack
 Killing of Deona M. Knajdek
 Charlottesville car attack
 2016 Nice truck attack

References

2020-related lists
Car-related lists
vehicle-ramming incidents
vehicle-ramming
Political violence in the United States
United States history-related lists
African American-related lists
Death in the United States-related lists
United States crime-related lists
Lists of events in the United States